Acantholytic dyskeratotic epidermal nevus is a cutaneous condition identical to the generalized form of Darier's disease. "Acantholytic dyskeratotic epidermal nevus" is probably the same disorder.

See also 
 Acrokeratosis verruciformis
 List of cutaneous conditions

References 

Genodermatoses